Rishab Jain (born December, 2004) is an inventor and cancer researcher. Jain was named America's Top Young Scientist at the age of 13. He was later named one of Time's 25 Most Influential Teens. In 2022, Jain won the Regeneron Young Scientist Award at the International Science and Engineering Fair.

Research
Jain studies cancer and bioengineering using artificial intelligence modeling.

In October 2018, Jain was named America's Top Young Scientist for an artificial intelligence tool which aims to improve radiotherapy procedures for pancreatic cancer patients. Jain's tool uses deep learning models trained on CT scan images of the abdomen. His tool, named 'PCDLS Net', segments the pancreas from CT in real time so that radiation oncologists can potentially administer therapy more effectively.

For this work, Jain was a featured researcher by the National Cancer Institute during the National Cancer Act's 50th Anniversary Commemoration, included among TIME's most influential teens, and had minor planet  named after him. Later, in 2019, he was included in The Times' Teen Power List and Insider's 16 teens who will take the world by storm in the 2020s.

In 2022, Jain developed an artificial intelligence software that aims to enable rapid and cost-effective production of drugs, such as recombinant COVID-19 vaccines, using synthetic DNA engineering. His model is trained to optimize the selection of genetic codes in DNA, and has been licensed commercially. For this research, Jain was inducted into the National Museum of Education's National Gallery for America's Young Inventors and won the Regeneron Young Scientist Award.

Activism
Jain is an activist for STEAM fields: science, technology, engineering, arts, and mathematics. Jain founded the Samyak Science Society, a non-profit organization for children science education. He has also been a supporter of pancreatic cancer awareness, having called for more research regarding this specific type of cancer.

In 2019, Jain spoke about STEAM fields at the Pontifical Urban University in Rome after receiving the Giuseppe Sciacca Foundation's 'Vincitore Assoluto' award. In February 2020, Jain spoke about the importance of scientific curiosity and pancreatic cancer research at the TEDxGateway event in Mumbai, India, giving example of his own research and inventions. In 2022, he spoke at the United States Patent and Trademark Office's Invention-Con.

Personal life
Born in 2004, Jain is an American of Indian descent.

Since 2019, he has attended Westview High School in Portland, Oregon and wishes to pursue medical school or an MD–PhD. Jain is also an Eagle Scout and has almost 100,000 subscribers on YouTube.

Jain is a 2022 Research Science Institute alum. He was later named a Regeneron Science Talent Search (STS) Scholar for his work on brain tumor modeling at RSI. In 2023, he joined the 35th class of Coca-Cola Scholars.

References 

2004 births
Living people
American medical researchers
American engineers
Scientists from Portland, Oregon